Therese Brunetti née Frey (1782-1864) was a stage actress and ballet dancer. She was engaged at the Estates Theatre in Prague in 1798-1833, where she belonged to the theatre's star attractions, noted for her grace and roles as heroine and within tragedy and referred to by critics as the best actress in Prague (1807). She was married to Giacomo Brunetti and known for her relationship to Carl Maria von Weber.

References 

 http://encyklopedie.idu.cz/index.php/Brunetti,_Therese

1782 births
1864 deaths
18th-century Bohemian actresses
18th-century Bohemian ballet dancers
Actresses from the Austrian Empire
Ballerinas from the Austrian Empire